The heavily glaciated Weißkamm is an Alpine chain that includes the Weißkugel and Wildspitze, the two highest peaks in the Ötztal Alps. Starting from the Weißkugel the Weißkamm runs for about 20 kilometres to the northwest towards Sölden. Other ridges branch off the Weißkamm striking northwards. From west to east these are the Glockturmkamm, the Kaunergrat and the Geigenkamm. The Weißkugel is where the Weißkamm joins the Schnalskamm, which runs in an easterly direction.

The Gepatschferner and the Mittelbergferner are the two largest glaciers in the Ötztal Alps; both are situated in the area of the Weißkamm. Together with the Kesselwandferner, Vernagtferner and Taschachferner they form an almost unbroken ice sheet.

Apart from the Weißkugel and the Wildspitze, other important summits on the Weißkamm are the Fluchtkogel, the Hochvernagtspitze, the Hinterer Brunnenkogel and the Hinterer Brochkogel

The Weißkamm from the  Schwemserspitze to the Wildspitze, seen from the Saykogel

Summits

Literature 
 B. und E. Pinzer: Pitztal Edition Löwenzahn, Innsbruck, 2000, 
 Walter Klier: Ötztaler Alpen, Alpine Club Guide, Bergverlag Rudolf Rother, Munich, 2006.

External links 

Ötztal Alps
Mountain ranges of Tyrol (state)